Harding may refer to:

People 
Harding (surname)
Maureen Harding Clark (born 1946), Irish jurist

Places

Australia
 Harding River

Iran
 Harding, Iran, a village in South Khorasan Province

South Africa
 Harding, KwaZulu-Natal

United States
 Harding, Georgia
 Harding, Kansas
 Harding, Minnesota
 Harding, New Jersey
 Harding, South Dakota
 Harding, West Virginia
 Harding, Wisconsin
 Harding County, New Mexico
 Harding County, South Dakota
 Harding Home, home and future presidential center of US president Warren G. Harding, in Marion, Ohio
 Harding Icefield, Alaska
 Harding Senior High School (St. Paul, Minnesota)
 Harding Township, Lucas County, Ohio
 Harding University, a private college located in Searcy, Arkansas, United States
 Harding University High School, a public high school in Charlotte, North Carolina
 Lake Harding, Georgia
 Chester Harding House, historic house in Massachusetts
 Sarah H. Harding House, a historical building in Andover, Massachusetts

Elsewhere
 Harding oilfield
 Harding (crater), a small lunar impact crater

Other uses 
 USS Harding (DD-91), destroyer

See also 
 Hardinge (disambiguation)
 Justice Harding (disambiguation)